GOES-2, known as GOES-B before becoming operational, was a geostationary weather satellite which was operated by the United States National Oceanic and Atmospheric Administration as part of the Geostationary Operational Environmental Satellite system. GOES-2 was built by Ford Aerospace, and was based on the satellite bus developed for the Synchronous Meteorological Satellite programme. It was positioned in geostationary orbit, from where it was used for weather forecasting in the United States. Following its retirement as a weather satellite, it was used as a communications satellite until its final decommissioning in 2001.

GOES-B was launched using a Delta 2914 carrier rocket flying from Launch Complex 17B at the Cape Canaveral Air Force Station. The launch occurred at 10:51:00 GMT on 16 June 1977. The launch successfully placed GOES-B into a geostationary transfer orbit, from which it raised itself to geostationary orbit by means of an onboard SVM-5 apogee motor. Its insertion into geosynchronous orbit occurred at 03:26 GMT on 17 June.

Following on-orbit testing, GOES-B was redesignated GOES-2, and replaced SMS-1 at a longitude of 60 degrees west. It was operated as a weather satellite at several different positions until 1993, and was then placed into storage. It was reactivated as a communications satellite in 1995, and moved to 177° West. It was used by Peacesat to provide communications services to islands in the Pacific Ocean, a role in which it was replaced by GOES 7 in 1999, and by the US National Science Foundation for communications with the Amundsen–Scott South Pole Station. On 5 May 2001, it was retired to a graveyard orbit. At 21:08 GMT, two hours after the last manoeuvre to remove it from geosynchronous orbit, GOES-2 was commanded to deactivate its communications system, preventing future ground commands being sent to it.

See also

1977 in spaceflight
TDRS-1

References

1977 in spaceflight
Spacecraft launched in 1977
Geostationary Operational Environmental Satellites